The 2009–10 Heineken Cup was the 15th season of the Heineken Cup, the annual rugby union European club competition for clubs from the top six nations in European rugby. It started in October 2009 and ended on 22 May 2010 with the final at Stade de France in which Toulouse defeated Biarritz 21 – 19 to win the trophy for the fourth time.

Teams
Seven English teams participated, as an English team, Leicester Tigers, progressed further in the previous year's tournament than any French or Italian team. France had six participants, Ireland three, Wales four, Italy two and Scotland two.

On Friday 29 May 2009, Newport Gwent Dragons defeated Calvisano 42–17 in a play-off to secure the 24th and final qualification place.

Seeding
The seeding system was the same as in the 2008–09 tournament. The 24 competing teams are ranked based on past Heineken Cup and European Challenge Cup performance, with each pool receiving one team from each quartile, or Tier. The requirement to have only one team per country in each pool, however, still applied (with the exception of the inclusion of the seventh English team).

The brackets show each team's European Rugby Club Ranking at the start of the 2009–10 season.

Pool stage

The draw for the pool stage took place on 9 June 2009 in Paris.

{| class="wikitable"
|+ Key to colours
|-
|bgcolor="#ccffcc"|    
|Winner of each pool, and best two runners-up,advance to quarterfinals. Seed # in parentheses
|-
|bgcolor="#ffffcc"|    
|Third- through fifth- highest-scoring second-place teamsparachute into the knockout stage of the European Challenge Cup.Seed # in brackets
|}

Pool 1

Pool 2

Pool 3

Pool 4

Pool 5

Pool 6

 Scarlets win the tiebreaker over London Irish by virtue of winning both of the matches between the two teams.

Seeding and runners-up
 Bare numbers indicate Heineken Cup quarterfinal seeding.
 Numbers with "C" indicate Challenge Cup quarterfinal seeding.

Knock-out stage
The semi-final draw was conducted on 24 January in Paris. The winner of the topmost quarter-final on each side of the bracket receives home-country advantage in its semi-final. (The competition organisers have traditionally allowed Biarritz to take semi-finals to Spain, as it has stadiums that meet Heineken Cup semi-final hosting requirements that are far closer to Biarritz than any acceptable venue in France. The club also enjoys large support in the Basque Country of Spain, a region with which it shares a cultural affinity.)

All times are local times.

Quarter-finals

Semi-finals

Final

The final was played at the Stade de France in Saint-Denis, Saint-Denis.

Leading scorers

Points

Tries

See also
2009–10 European Challenge Cup

Notes and references

 
Heineken Cup seasons
Heinekm
Heinekm
Heinekm
Heinekm
Heinekm
Heinekm